The Goianides Ocean was an ocean that existed in South America in Neoproterozoic times. It separated the Paranapanema block and the São Francisco Craton. Its closure started with a magmatic arc forming (now seen as granitoids of the Guaxupé and Socorro Nappes) and eventually gave rise to the Brasiliano orogeny.

See also

References

Historical oceans